Ritmo, Ritual e Responsa (Portuguese for "Rhythm, Ritual and Responsibility") is the eighth studio album by Brazilian alternative rock band Charlie Brown Jr. Their final studio release with drummer André Pinguim, who left the band one year later, it came out on November 15, 2007, through EMI. Billed as the first part of the soundtrack of the film  (even though a second part was never formally planned or released), written and co-produced by vocalist Chorão, and serving as somewhat of a concept album inspired by key events of the film, it counted with guest appearances by bands and artists such as MV Bill, João Gordo, Paranormal Attack, Forfun, Sacramento MCs and Markon Lobotomia.

The album's first single, "Não Viva em Vão", was released in advance on April 9, 2007, coinciding with Chorão's 37th birthday. It was followed by the hits "Pontes Indestrutíveis", "Be Myself" and "Uma Criança com Seu Olhar"; the first two were included in the soundtracks of Rede Globo's telenovelas Amor à Vida (2013–2014) and Duas Caras (2007–2008), respectively. The music video for "Não Viva em Vão" received a nomination for the MTV Video Music Brazil award in the "Video of the Year" category in 2007; the following year, "Pontes Indestrutíveis" was nominated in the "Video of the Year" and "Hit of the Year" categories.

In 2008, Ritmo, Ritual e Responsa was nominated for a Latin Grammy Award for Best Portuguese Language Rock or Alternative Album; the band's fourth release to receive a nomination following Nadando com os Tubarões, Bocas Ordinárias and Imunidade Musical.

Critical reception
Anderson Nascimento of Galeria Musical gave the album a positive rating of 3 out of 5 stars. Conversely, Débora Miranda, writing for G1, rated it with a 4 out of 10, calling it a heavier and more eclectic album sonority-wise but criticizing it as being "lyrically repetitive". Mauro Ferreira of blog Notas Musicais gave the album a mixed review, rating it with 3 stars out of 5 and calling it a "good-intentioned, motivational release with self-help undertones", finishing by comparing Chorão to a priest preaching the good for his fans.

Track listing

Personnel
 Charlie Brown Jr.
 Chorão – vocals
 Heitor Gomes – bass guitar
 Thiago Castanho – electric guitar
 André Pinguim – drums, beatboxing

 Additional musicians
 MV Bill – additional vocals in "Sem Medo da Escuridão"
 Forfun – vocals in "O Universo a Nosso Favor"
 Sacramento MCs – additional vocals in "Vivendo a Vida numa Louca Viagem" and "Skateboard Amor Eterno"
 Markon Lobotomia – additional vocals in "Que Espécie de Vermes São Vocês?"
 João Gordo – additional vocals in "Vida de Magnata"
 Paranormal Attack – additional vocals in "Paranormal"

References

2007 albums
EMI Records albums
Charlie Brown Jr. albums
Concept albums